Ten Minute Alibi is a 1935 British crime film directed by Bernard Vorhaus and starring Phillips Holmes, Aileen Marson and Theo Shall. It was made at Beaconsfield Studios.

The film's sets were designed by the art director Andrew Mazzei.

Cast
 Phillips Holmes as Colin Derwent  
 Aileen Marson as Betty Findon  
 Theo Shall as Philip Sevilla  
 Morton Selten as Sir Miles Standish  
 George Merritt as Inspector Pember  
 Charles Hickman as Sgt. Brace  
 Philip Hatfield as Hunter  
 Dora Gregory as Charwoman  
 Grace Poggi as Dancer  
 Francis De Wolff

References

Bibliography
 Low, Rachael. Filmmaking in 1930s Britain. George Allen & Unwin, 1985.
 Wood, Linda. British Films, 1927-1939. British Film Institute, 1986.

External links

1935 films
1935 crime films
British crime films
Films shot at Beaconsfield Studios
Films directed by Bernard Vorhaus
Films produced by Paul Soskin
British black-and-white films
1930s English-language films
1930s British films